Neeruti (until 1920: Buxhoewden) is a village in Kadrina Parish, Lääne-Viru County, in northeastern Estonia. It lies on the left bank of the Loobu River. Neeruti is known for its manor (at that time Buxhöwden castle) now in ruins, built in Jugendstil for Count von Rehbinder.

References

 

Villages in Lääne-Viru County
Kreis Wierland
Tourist attractions in Lääne-Viru County